Adams Morgan is a neighborhood in Northwest Washington, D.C., centered at the intersection of 18th Street NW and Columbia Road, about 1.5 miles (2.54 km) north of the White House. Notable establishments in the neighborhood include the Washington Hilton and Madam's Organ Blues Bar. Notable residential buildings include Euclid Apartments, Fuller House, Park Tower, Meridian Mansions, and the Pink Palace. Embassies in the neighborhood include the Embassy of Lithuania, the Embassy of Poland, the Embassy of the Central African Republic, the Embassy of Gabon and the Embassy of Cuba. Notable public artwork in Adams Morgan includes Carry the Rainbow on Your Shoulders, The Servant Christ, and The Mama Ayesha's Restaurant Presidential Mural.

Adams Morgan is a thriving spot for nightlife and live music, particularly along 18th Street NW. Approximately 100 establishments possess liquor licenses. A moratorium on new liquor licenses has been in effect since 2000.

It has been referred to as D.C.'s last funky neighborhood, although some say it is past its prime. It has also been referred to as "quirky".

It is composed of rowhouses and classically-styled mid-rise apartment buildings, including many cooperatives and condominiums, along with various commercial structures.

The name Adams Morgan, once hyphenated, is derived from the names of two formerly segregated area elementary schools—the older, all-black Thomas P. Morgan Elementary School (now defunct) and the all-white John Quincy Adams Elementary School, which merged in 1955 following racial desegregation.

Adams Morgan is bounded: 
to the south by Florida Avenue NW and the Dupont Circle neighborhood
to the southwest by the Duke Ellington Bridge and by Connecticut Avenue NW and Kalorama-Sheridan
to the north by Harvard St. and Mount Pleasant
 to the east by 16th Street NW and Columbia Heights

Reed-Cooke is a sub-neighborhood of Adams Morgan, consisting of the easternmost area between Columbia Road and Florida avenue.

History
Before the colony of Maryland was established in 1632, what is now Washington, D.C. was home to the Nacotchtank Native American tribal group, a branch of the Piscataway people.

When the District of Columbia was created in 1791, Robert Peter and Anthony Holmead, two prominent colonial-era landowners, held the land comprising Adams Morgan. At that time, these local tracts were north of the original planned City of Washington, and were either undeveloped or only lightly farmed. As the population of D.C. expanded, this land was divided into several estates purchased by wealthy residents, including Meridian Hill, Cliffbourne, Holt House, Oak Lawn, Henderson Castle, a part of Kalorama, and the horse farm of William Thornton.

After the American Civil War, these estates were subdivided and the area slowly grew. Once the city's overall-layout plans were finalized in the 1890s, these various subdivisions, using modern construction techniques, developed more rapidly, and the area of Adams Morgan then grew into several attractive and largely upper- and middle-class neighborhoods.

In the early 20th century, the area was home to a range of people, from the very wealthy living along 16th Street, to white-collar professionals in Lanier Heights, to blue-collar residents east of 18th Street NW.

After World War II and Brown v. Board of Education, racial desegregation began. When D.C. was formally desegregated, some whites abruptly left the area, other whites stayed and worked to integrate the neighborhood, and some African Americans and Hispanics moved into the area. With cheaper housing, the area also became home to some artists and social activists.

In 1948, Charles Lazarus founded Toys "R" Us in Adams Morgan.

In the early 1950s, before desegregation, the neighborhood was considered "ritzy".

Pursuant to the 1954 Bolling v. Sharpe Supreme Court ruling, district schools were desegregated in 1955. The Adams-Morgan Community Council, comprising both Adams and Morgan schools and the neighborhoods they served, formed in 1958 to implement progressively this desegregation. The boundaries of the neighborhood were drawn through four existing neighborhoods—Washington Heights, Lanier Heights, Kalorama Triangle, and Meridian Hill—naming the resulting area after both schools.

In 1955, Herbert Haft founded Dart Drug in Adams Morgan.

In the late 1960s, a group of residents worked with city officials to plan and construct the Marie H. Reed Recreation Center, an elementary school and recreational complex. The development was named after the minister and civic leader. It features a daycare center, tennis and basketball courts, a solar-heated swimming pool, health clinic, athletic field, and outdoor chess tables.

After the 1968 Washington, D.C., riots, white flight continued.

In the 1960s, the neighborhood's attractions included the Avignon Freres bakery and restaurant, which furnished the White House with cakes and pastries, the Café Don restaurant, the Ontario motion picture theater, and the Showboat Lounge jazz nightclub. In 1967, the Ambassador Theater opened; it closed in 1969.

In the 1980s, Hazel Williams operated Hazel's, which featured live blues and jazz, and its soul food offerings made it a favorite of Dizzy Gillespie and Muhammad Ali when they were in Washington, D.C.

The January 20, 2005 counter-inaugural protest included a march through Adams Morgan.

From 2010 to 2012, the city reconstructed 18th Street NW, one of the neighborhood's main commercial corridors, with wider sidewalks, more crosswalks and bicycle arrows, resulting in a more pedestrian-friendly thoroughfare.

In September 2014, the American Planning Association named Adams Morgan one of the nation's "great neighborhoods", citing its intact Victorian rowhouses, murals, international diversity, and pedestrian- and cyclist-friendly streetscape.

In 2021, many local businesses attempted to disband the local business improvement district. However, they were unsuccessful.

Demographics

Along with neighboring Mount Pleasant and Columbia Heights, Adams Morgan long has been a gateway community for immigrants. Since the 1960s, the predominant international presence in both communities has been Latino, with the majority of immigrants coming from El Salvador, Guatemala and other Central American countries. It also has attracted immigrants from Africa, Asia and the Caribbean.

Since 1980, the population of the neighborhood increased marginally from 15,352 to 15,630, while average real annual household income more than doubled from $72,753 to $172,249 and the white non-hispanic population increased from 51% to 68%.

Local institutions
Adams Morgan Day is a multicultural street celebration with live music and food and crafts booths.

The Adams Morgan farmers' market operates, weather permitting, every Saturday from June to December. Local growers sell fresh, organically grown produce and herbs, baked and canned goods, cheeses, cold-pressed apple juice, and fresh flowers.

The Adams Morgan Partnership Business Improvement District (AMPBID) has been active in the community since 2005; its stated mission is to promote a clean, friendly and safe Adams Morgan. It sponsors local events such as summer concerts and holiday decorations, and provides information to residents.

Transportation

Adams Morgan is not directly served by the Washington Metro system. The station nearest to Adams Morgan, Woodley Park station, is in the Woodley Park neighborhood, but was renamed "Woodley Park–Zoo/Adams Morgan" in 1999 to reflect the station's proximity to Adams Morgan. The station was renamed "Woodley Park" with "Zoo/Adams Morgan" as a subtitle in 2011. The southernmost parts of the neighborhood near Rock Creek Park are closer to the Dupont Circle station, while the northeastern parts of the neighborhood are closer to the Columbia Heights Station. In March 2009, the Washington Metropolitan Area Transit Authority (WMATA) began operating a DC Circulator bus route connecting the center of Adams Morgan with both Metro stations. The area is also served by several WMATA Metrobus lines, including the 42, 43, 90, 92, 96, H1, L2, S2, and S9.

Education

The District of Columbia Public Schools is the public school system.
Adams, Reed, and H.D. Cooke elementary schools all have international populations, with children from over 30 nations in attendance. Latino and African-American children comprise the majority of students in the public schools.

Oyster Adams Bilingual School, the neighborhood K-8 school, was formed in 2007 by the merger of John Quincy Adams Elementary School in Adams Morgan and James F. Oyster Bilingual Elementary School in Woodley Park. The Adams campus serves grades 4-8 and the Oyster campus serves grades Pre-Kindergarten through 3.

The Marie Reed Elementary School, with its Learning Center, built in 1977, was extensively remodeled and reopened in 2017.

H.D. Cooke Elementary School is at 2525 17th Street; it was renovated in 2009 as an environmentally friendly green building.

Part of the neighborhood is assigned to Oyster-Adams K-8, part is assigned to Marie Reed Elementary and Columbia Heights Education Campus, and part is assigned to H.D. Cooke Elementary and Columbia Heights Education Campus. The entire neighborhood is assigned to Jackson-Reed High School.

City politics
Adams Morgan is a part of Ward 1, and is in the service area of Advisory Neighborhood Commission 1C, the Adams Morgan Advisory Neighborhood Commission. The ANC covers the area between Harvard Street and Rock Creek to the north, Florida Avenue and U Street to the south, 16th Street NW to the east, and Connecticut Avenue to the west.

Notable residents and former residents

 Florence Augusta Merriam Bailey
 Vernon Orlando Bailey
 William Bankhead
 Carl Bernstein and Nora Ephron - lived in the Ontario Apartments for many years after the Watergate scandal
 Gary Condit - California Representative suspected at one point in the murder of Chandra Levy; lived on Adams Mill Road in Adams Morgan while he was a congressman and during his affair with Levy
 John L. DeWitt
 Dwight D. Eisenhower
 Mamie Eisenhower
 Nora Ephron and Carl Bernstein - lived in the Ontario Apartments for many years after the Watergate scandal; Ephron wrote her book Heartburn about their time as a married couple in the building
 Father's Children - funk band formed in Adams Morgan
 Thomas Gore
 Jim Graham
 Alexander Campbell King
 Jane Tunstall Lingo
 Josephine Diebitsch Peary
 Robert Peary
 Nora Pouillon
 Robert Maxwell Pringle
 José Ribalta
 Robert F. Rockwell
 Wendell Phillips Stafford - in addition to living in Adams Morgan, an apartment building on Lanier Place was named for him
 Josiah Alexander Van Orsdel
 Paul Zukerberg
Saagar Enjeti

In popular culture

Film and television
The neighborhood's competing "jumbo slice" pizza establishments were covered in an episode of the Travel Channel's Food Wars.

In the Showtime Network series Homeland Season 3, Episode 4 ("Game On"), the main character Carrie Mathison states that she lives in Adams Morgan.

Scenes from the 2010 movie How Do You Know featuring Paul Rudd and Reese Witherspoon were filmed in Adams Morgan.

In the Netflix series Taken, the neighborhood is mentioned in Season 1, Episode 8, as the location where a car bomb explodes.

In the 1993 feature film "In the Line of Fire," Secret Service Agent Frank Horrigan (Clint Eastwood) lives in Adams Morgan, likely at the corner of 18th St NW and Belmont Rd NW. The film features several locations in Washington, and Adams Morgan in particular.

See also
 List of restaurant districts and streets in the United States
Architecture of Washington, D.C.

References

External links

 Advisory Neighborhood Commission 1C
 Adams Morgan Heritage Trail, Cultural Tourism DC
 Oyster Adams Bilingual School
 Marie Reed Elementary School

 
Neighborhoods in Northwest (Washington, D.C.)
Restaurant districts and streets in the United States
Entertainment districts in the United States